Fahad Al-Geaid (born 24 November 1967) is a Saudi Arabian equestrian. He competed in the 2000 Summer Olympics.

References

1967 births
Living people
Equestrians at the 2000 Summer Olympics
Saudi Arabian male equestrians
Olympic equestrians of Saudi Arabia